is a former Japanese football player. She played for Japan national team.

Club career
Takahagi was born on April 17, 1969. She played for Shinko Seiko FC Clair.

National team career
On January 21, 1986, when Takahagi was 16 years old, she debuted for Japan national team against India. She played at 1986, 1989 and 1991 AFC Championship. She also played at 1990 Asian Games. She was a member of Japan for 1991 World Cup. She played 31 games for Japan until 1991.

National team statistics

References

External links
 

1969 births
Living people
Tokyo Gakugei University alumni
Place of birth missing (living people)
Japanese women's footballers
Japan women's international footballers
Nadeshiko League players
Tokyo Shidax LSC players
Footballers at the 1990 Asian Games
1991 FIFA Women's World Cup players
Women's association football defenders
Asian Games silver medalists for Japan
Asian Games medalists in football
Medalists at the 1990 Asian Games